David Katz (born 1965) is an American author and documentary radio and film producer. He has been described as "one of the world's foremost authorities on reggae, dub, and dancehall".

Biography
Katz was born in 1965 in San Francisco, and raised in the Bay Area, where he exposed to reggae as a teen from the local radio station, KTIM.

He obtained a BA in English Literature from San Francisco State University and moved to London, England, in the 1980s, where he was retained as Lee Perry's biographer, and later completed an MA in Media Studies at Goldsmiths, University of London.

Career
Katz is author of People Funny Boy: The Genius of Lee "Scratch" Perry, Solid Foundation: An Oral History of Reggae, and Caribbean Lives: Jimmy Cliff.

He has contributed to many other books on music and culture, including the Rough Guide to Reggae, A Tapestry of Jamaica, Caribbean Popular Music: An Encyclopedia, Keep On Running: The Story of Island Records and Mashup: The Birth of Modern Culture. His writing and photographs have appeared in many international publications, including The Guardian, The Telegraph, The Independent, Newsweek, Mojo, Q, Wax Poetics, Riddim, Caribbean Beat and Murder Dog. Katz has coordinated and annotated more than 100 retrospective collections of Jamaican music, has released original records in the UK and France, and has co-hosted reggae radio programmes on three continents. In 2013, he was invited to present at the University of the West Indies' 2013 International Reggae Conference.

Katz has produced documentaries for Afropop Worldwide/Public Radio International and contributed to radio and television documentaries for the BBC, Channel 4 and Arte and was a music consultant on the feature film Dreaming Lhasa.

Katz holds a regular residency as a disc jockey, presenting the "Dub Me Always" reggae vinyl nights at the Ritzy in Brixton and has played at venues and festivals throughout Europe, the US, Japan and Brazil. He has also co-chaired panel discussions with performers, journalists and filmmakers at various music festivals and given presentations at different international universities and other venues.

Originally from San Francisco, he has been a London resident for many years.

Critical reaction

In an Uncut review of the revised and expanded edition of People Funny Boy published by White Rabbit, Jim Wirth said: 

Mark Terrill, writing in Rain Taxi, said of the book People Funny Boy:

Mike Atherton, writing in Record Collector, said of the book People Funny Boy:

Regarding the book Solid Foundation, in The Guardian, Colin Grant said:

A review in Spannered of the book Solid Foundation says:

Jay Trachtenberg, writing in The Austin Chronicle, said of Solid Foundation:

A review of Solid Foundation in Reggaezine said:

Chris Menist, writing in With Guitars, said of Solid Foundation:

Bibliography

References

External links
 

1965 births
American documentary film producers
American emigrants to England
American music journalists
British documentary filmmakers
British music journalists
English music journalists
Living people
Mojo (magazine) people
Reggae journalists
Writers from San Francisco
San Francisco State University alumni